Kim Nekroman is the bassist and lead singer for the psychobilly band Nekromantix and the lead guitarist of HorrorPops. He is from Denmark, and worked for the Danish Navy as a submarine radio operator for eight years before beginning his music career.

He plays the  upright bass, featuring a custom coffin-shaped bass  He is an endorser and user of Gallien-Krueger bass amps.

Timeline 
In 1991 the band toured extensively in Europe, releasing Curse of the Coffin, their second full-length album that same year. The Brought Back to Life LP appeared in 1992, and 4 years later Nekromantix released their fourth disc,  Demons Are a Girl's Best Friend. A tour in Japan followed, as well as a 1999 live set for Kick Music. Nekromantix signed with Epitaph for 2002's Return of the Loving Dead, and are still with the label through Dead Girls Don't Cry and 2005's Brought Back to Life Again, the latter of which was actually reissue of an out print 1992 release.

Nekromantix 
Backing up Nekroman's vocals in '07 were guitarist Troy Destroy and drummer Andy DeMize. However, the current line-up is Adam Guerrero on drums (after the death of Andy DeMize and departure of Lux), Franc on guitar and Nekroman himself on coffin bass and lead vocals. Rene De La Muerte joined the band in 2018 as the new stand-up drummer.

Discography

with Nekromantix 
Hellbound
Curse of the Coffin
Brought Back to Life
Demons Are a Girl's Best Friend
Undead 'n' Live
Return of the Loving Dead
Dead Girls Don't Cry
Life Is a Grave & I Dig It!
What Happens in Hell, Stays in Hell
A Symphony of Wolftones & Ghostnotes

with HorrorPops 
Hell Yeah!
Bring It On!
Kiss Kiss Kill Kill

with Mek & the X-Mas Peks 
Mek & the X-Mas Peks

compilations 
Give 'Em the Boot IV
Give 'Em the Boot V
Mek & X-Mas Peks — X-Mas Peks (CD) Kick Music 2000

References

External links 
HorrorPops official website – (2006)
IMDB biography – (2006)
WreckingPit.com's bio for Nekromantix – (10/2005)
Discography for Kim Nekroman – (2005)
Epitaph Records – HorrorPops profile
HellCat Records – HorrorPops profile
HellCat Records – Nekromantix profile

Danish double-bassists
Male double-bassists
Psychobilly musicians
Danish rockabilly musicians
Living people
People from Copenhagen
Year of birth missing (living people)
Rock double-bassists
Slap bassists (double bass)
21st-century double-bassists
21st-century male musicians